Pardosa thorelli is a wolf spider species found in Norway.

The specific epithet is given to honor Swedish arachnologist Tamerlan Thorell (1830–1901).

See also 
 List of Lycosidae species

References

External links 

thorelli
Spiders of Europe
Spiders described in 1876